Booral is a locality in the Mid-Coast Council local government area in the Mid North Coast region of New South Wales, Australia.

Booral Public School opened in October 1865. It had an enrolment of 85 students in 2017.

Booral Post Office opened in January 1874 and closed on 30 June 1986.

50.1% of residents are Christian, 39.8% have no religion, 1% are Muslim, 0.7% are Buddhists, and 7.6% haven't stated their religion.

89% of residents are born in Australia, 7% have not started their place of birth, 2% were born in the United Kingdom, 1% were born in New Zealand, and 1% were born in other countries.

Heritage listings 
Booral has a number of heritage-listed sites, including:
 The Bucketts Way: Gundayne House

References 

 
Localities in New South Wales
Suburbs of Mid-Coast Council